Anna Wierzbowska (born 8 December 1990) is a Polish rower. She competed in the women's coxless pair event at the 2016 Summer Olympics.

References

External links
 

1990 births
Living people
Polish female rowers
Olympic rowers of Poland
Rowers at the 2016 Summer Olympics
Sportspeople from Kraków
European Rowing Championships medalists